East Helena is a city in Lewis and Clark County, Montana, United States, approximately  east of downtown Helena. The population was 1,944 at the 2020 census. It is part of the Helena Micropolitan Statistical Area, which includes all of Lewis and Clark and Jefferson counties; its population is 83,058 according to the 2020 Census.

History
The settlement became East Helena in 1889, after the construction of the Helena & Livingston Smelting & Reduction Company’s smelter.

Geography
East Helena is located at  (46.589856, -111.916798).

Climate
According to the Köppen Climate Classification system, East Helena has a semi-arid climate, abbreviated "BSk" on climate maps.

Demographics

2010 census
As of the census of 2010, there were 1,984 people, 875 households, and 528 families living in the city. The racial makeup of the city was 91.0% White, 0.5% African American, 3.3% Native American, 0.3% Asian, 0.2% Pacific Islander, 0.4% from other races, and 4.3% from two or more races. Hispanic or Latino of any race were 3.6% of the population.

There were 875 households, of which 29.0% had children under the age of 18 living with them, 41.7% were married couples living together, 13.6% had a female householder with no husband present, 5.0% had a male householder with no wife present, and 39.7% were non-families. 32.0% of all households were made up of individuals, and 10.3% had someone living alone who was 65 years of age or older. The average household size was 2.27 and the average family size was 2.85.

The median age in the city was 36.3 years. 22.9% of residents were under the age of 18; 9.3% were between the ages of 18 and 24; 28.6% were from 25 to 44; 26% were from 45 to 64; and 13.2% were 65 years of age or older. The gender makeup of the city was 48.7% male and 51.3% female.

2000 census
As of the census of 2000, there were 1,642 people, 694 households, and 462 families living in the town. The population density was 1,963.8 people per square mile (754.7/km2). There were 728 housing units at an average density of 870.7 per square mile (334.6/km2). The racial makeup of the town was 94.70% White, 0.18% African American, 3.11% Native American, 0.06% Asian, 0.55% from other races, and 1.40% from two or more races. Hispanic or Latino of any race were 1.83% of the population. 22.3% were of German, 13.8% Irish, 12.8% Norwegian, 8.2% English, 6.1% American and 6.1% French ancestry according to Census 2000.

There were 694 households, out of which 30.0% had children under the age of 18 living with them, 52.7% were married couples living together, 9.5% had a female householder with no husband present, and 33.4% were non-families. 29.8% of all households were made up of individuals, and 12.8% had someone living alone who was 65 years of age or older. The average household size was 2.37 and the average family size was 2.92.

In the town, the population was spread out, with 25.2% under the age of 18, 6.6% from 18 to 24, 29.8% from 25 to 44, 22.1% from 45 to 64, and 16.3% who were 65 years of age or older. The median age was 38 years. For every 100 females, there were 96.4 males. For every 100 females age 18 and over, there were 93.4 males.

The median income for a household in the town was $31,071, and the median income for a family was $35,455. Males had a median income of $28,472 versus $19,828 for females. The per capita income for the town was $15,893. About 7.5% of families and 8.6% of the population were below the poverty line, including 15.7% of those under age 18 and 5.5% of those age 65 or over.

Education

Public schools 
Eastgate Elementary School
Prickly Pear Elementary School
Radley Elementary School
East Valley Middle School
East Helena High School

Libraries 
East Helena has a public library, a branch of the Lewis & Clark Library.

References

External links

Cities in Lewis and Clark County, Montana
Helena, Montana micropolitan area
Cities in Montana